was a bureaucrat and cabinet minister in early Shōwa period Japan.

Biography
Ushio was born in Shimane Prefecture. After his graduation in 1907 from the law school of Tokyo Imperial University with a major in constitutional law, he entered the Home Ministry. He rose rapidly within the ministry, serving as Bureau Director for Health and Welfare, and Bureau Director for Local Affairs. In 1928, he became Vice-Minister. In 1931, he was appointed under-secretary for the House of Peers. In 1932, he returned to the Home Ministry as Vice-Minister, overseeing civil service appointment reforms, and enforcement of laws aimed at reducing election fraud issues.

He was appointed simultaneously Home Minister and interim Education Minister in 1935 under the Kōki Hirota administration. Ushio was selected for his opposition to the military, lack of political party ties and noted strength at bureaucratic innovation and reform, and for these same reasons his appointment came under criticism from many vested interests.

In 1938, Ushio was made a member of the Privy Council, and in 1946 became the final Vice-Chairman of the Privy Council before that body was dissolved by order of the American occupation authorities. Ushio was chairman of a committee of thirteen councilors assigned to review and comment on the new post-war Constitution of Japan.

References
 Moore, Ray. A.  Partners for Democracy: Crafting the New Japanese State Under MacArthur. Oxford University Press (2004). 
 Hunter, Janet.  A Concise Dictionary of Modern Japanese History . University of California Press (1994).

External links
Ministry of Education home page

Notes

 

1881 births
1955 deaths
People from Shimane Prefecture
University of Tokyo alumni
Government ministers of Japan
Ministers of Home Affairs of Japan